Joe Cocker – Classics, Volume 4 is a greatest hits compilation for Joe Cocker, released in 1987 by A&M Records as part of A&M's classics series of greatest hits albums for artists on its label. This compilation is label-exclusive; therefore, it only contains Joe Cocker's hits on the A&M label.

Track listing
"Feeling Alright" (1969) – 4:11
"You Are So Beautiful" (1974) – 2:42
"High Time We Went" (1972) – 4:29
"She Came In Through the Bathroom Window" (1969) – 2:38
"The Letter" (1970) – 4:21
"Midnight Rider" (1972) – 4:01
"With a Little Help from My Friends" (1968) – 5:04
"Woman to Woman" (1972) – 4:27
"Cry Me a River" (1970) – 3:54
"I Think It's Going to Rain Today" (1975) – 3:58
"Delta Lady" (1969) – 2:50
"Darling Be Home Soon" (1969) – 4:42
"The Jealous Kind" (1976) – 3:49

References

1987 greatest hits albums
Joe Cocker compilation albums
A&M Records compilation albums